Gaubitsch is a town in the district of Mistelbach in the Austrian state of Lower Austria.

The municipality of Gaubitsch is divided into these subdivisions:

Population

References

Cities and towns in Mistelbach District